İsmail Arca (born 5 September 1948) is a Turkish former football player, who played as a defender, and manager. He spent his entire professional career with Eskişehirspor, and is known by his nickname Büyük Kaptan (Turkish, "Great Captain").

Professional career
Arca begun playing football with İnegöl İdman Yurdu in 1962, and in 1964 moved to Eskisehir Fatihspor where he attended his local highschool. He moved to Eskişehirspor in 1965, and remained in the team for 17 years, becoming their captain. Arca holds the record for most official caps with Eskişehirspor, with 542 official appearances across all competitions.

International career
An international footballer for Turkey, Arca scored his only international goal in a 2–1 UEFA Euro 1976 qualifying win over Switzerland on 1 December 1974.

Honours
Eskişehirspor
Prime Minister's Cup (1): 1965–1966
TFF First League (1): 1965–1966
Turkish Cup (1): 1970–71
Turkish Super Cup (1): 1970–71

Turkey national football team
 ECO Cup (1): 1974

References

External links
 
 
 TFF Manager Profile
 NFT Profile

1948 births
Living people
People from İnegöl
Turkish footballers
Turkish football managers
Turkey international footballers
Turkey B international footballers
Turkey youth international footballers
Association football defenders
Eskişehirspor footballers
Eskişehirspor managers
Süper Lig players
TFF First League players
Süper Lig managers